Buford Mountain Conservation Area consists of  north of Ironton and southwest of Bismarck, Missouri. The mountain consists mostly of rhyolite, with few permanent water sources.

The central feature, Buford Mountain, has the name of the local Buford family who settled the area. The Missouri Department of Conservation purchased the area from the Nature Conservancy in 1979. Hunting is permitted in the area in the appropriate season with permits.

See also

 List of mountain peaks of Missouri

References

Protected areas established in 1979
Protected areas of Iron County, Missouri
Protected areas of Washington County, Missouri
Conservation Areas of Missouri
Mountains of Missouri
Mountains of Iron County, Missouri
Landforms of Iron County, Missouri
Landforms of Washington County, Missouri
Mountains of Washington County, Missouri